Rayón may refer to:
Rayón, Chiapas, Mexico
Rayón, State of México, Mexico
Rayón, San Luis Potosí, Mexico
Rayón, Sonora, Mexico